"Monsters of the New Wave" is a single by London glam rock band, Rachel Stamp. This single was the band's final single release via the Cruisin' Records label and received the Single of the Week in Kerrang! magazine, October 2000. The single was released on two formats (CD single and a limited edition 7" vinyl) and a promotional video for the single was filmed by Paul Harries. The single was also released across Europe through Raw Power Records with a different track listing and artwork.

UK CD Single & 7" Vinyl
Released October 2, 2000
(CR RS 005)

Track listing
 Monsters of the New Wave
 Black Cherry (live)
 Please Don't Touch (live)

Facts 
 "Monsters of the New Wave" was released as a CD single and limited edition 7" vinyl of 500 copies.
 The artwork for the CD single was by Michael Corran. The artwork was inspired by a Sweet album.
 The single features two tracks left over from the "Stampax" live album - an early live version of "Black Cherry" and a cover of the Johnny Kidd and the Pirates song, "Please Don't Touch". These songs were recorded on the "Hymns for Strange Children Tour" of the UK, early 2000.
 "Monsters of the New Wave" was the last single the band released through Cruisin' Records. The song can also be found on the "Now I'm Nailed To Your Bedroom Wall, I've Only Got Myself To Blame" compilation.

European CD single 
Released June 2000
(RP-010)

Track listing
 Monsters of the New Wave
 I Got The Worm (live)
 Spank (live)

Facts 
 Released via Raw Power Records across Europe to coincide with a European Tour in support of "Hymns for Strange Children".
 The single was deleted after the tour and was only released on CD
 Features the same B-sides as the "Hey Hey Michael You're Really Fantastic... Live!" CD single
 Artwork by Matt Abenny

Promotional video 
 A promotional video for the single was directed by Paul Harries.
 David Ryder-Prangley: "directed by PAUL HARRIES. i like this one - us in a white studio at the height of ultra cartoon phase of the band. apparently picked out by MARILYN MANSON on some tv show as a favourite although i'm not sure what the exact story is... line up as above with also shaheena..." (taken from a fan site interview, 2004)

References

 The Rachel Stamp Discography
 The Official Rachel Stamp website, retrieved via archive.org
 Kerrang! Single of the Week review, retrieved via archive.org
 The Rachel Stamp Videography

External links 
 "Monsters of the New Wave" promotional video on YouTube

2000 singles
Rachel Stamp songs